Michele L. Norris (born September 7, 1961) is an American journalist. Since 2019, Norris has worked as an opinion columnist with The Washington Post. She's best known for co-hosting NPR's evening news program All Things Considered from 2002-2011. She was the first African-American female host for NPR. Before that Norris was a correspondent for ABC News, as well as the Chicago Tribune and the Los Angeles Times. Norris is also a member of the Peabody Awards board of directors, which is presented by the University of Georgia's Henry W. Grady College of Journalism and Mass Communication.

Early life
Norris was born in Hennepin County, Minnesota, to Elizabeth Jean "Betty" and Belvin Norris Jr. Her mother is a fourth-generation Minnesotan and her father hails from Alabama. Belvin served in the Navy in World War II. Michele attended Washburn High School in Minneapolis, and later the University of Wisconsin–Madison, where she first studied electrical engineering, before transferring to the University of Minnesota where she majored in journalism and mass communications.

Career
At the University of Minnesota, Norris wrote for the Minnesota Daily, and then became a reporter for WCCO-TV.

Norris wrote for The Washington Post, the Chicago Tribune, and the Los Angeles Times. In 1990, while at The Washington Post, Norris received the Livingston Award for articles she wrote about the life of a six-year-old boy who lived with a crack-addicted mother in a crack house.

From 1993 to 2002, Norris was a news correspondent for ABC News, winning an Emmy Award and a Peabody Award for coverage of the September 11 attacks.

NPR
Norris joined the NPR evening news program All Things Considered on December 9, 2002, becoming the first African-American female host for NPR. In 2015, Fortune described Norris as "one of [NPR's] biggest stars." Norris worked alongside Melissa Block, and Robert Siegel.

Norris' coverage of Hurricane Katrina and its aftermath won acclaim early in her time at NPR. She moderated a Democratic Presidential debate in Iowa, alongside Steve Inskeep and Robert Siegel. In 2008, Norris teamed with Morning Edition host Steve Inskeep for The York Project: Race & The '08 Vote. Inskeep and Norris share a Alfred I. duPont–Columbia University Award silver baton award. In her time hosting Norris interviewed a wide range of politicians and celebrities including President Barack Obama, Susan Rice, Quincy Jones, and Joan Rivers among others.

Norris announced on October 24, 2011, that she would temporarily step down from her All Things Considered hosting duties and refrain from involvement in any NPR political coverage during the 2012 election year due to her husband's appointment to the Barack Obama 2012 presidential re-election campaign. On January 3, 2013, NPR announced that Norris had stepped down as a regular host of All Things Considered and would instead serve as an occasional host and special correspondent.

The Race Card Project
The Race Card Project was a project Norris began in 2010 while at NPR, inviting people to submit comments on their experience of race in the United States in six words. Norris and collaborators won a 2014 Peabody Award for the project.

In December 2015, Norris left NPR to focus on the Race Card Project. In July 2020, Simon & Schuster announced a book deal for the project. The currently untitled book is based Norris' collection of hundreds of thousands of hidden conversations for The Race Card Project archive. It will be followed by a related children’s book.

The Grace of Silence
Norris is also the author of The Grace of Silence, a memoir and reported non-fiction book that started as an extension of an NPR series about race relations in the United States called the Race Card Project. In the book Norris uncovers secrets about race including in her family. In the book Norris writes of discovering her father’s shooting by a Birmingham police officer and also her maternal grandmother’s job as an itinerant Aunt Jemima.

Awards
 2006 Emmy Award for ABC News coverage of the September 11 attacks
 2006 Peabody Award for ABC News coverage of the September 11 attacks
 2009 Journalist of the Year, National Association of Black Journalists (NABJ), citing Norris's coverage of the 2008 U.S. presidential election
 2013 Honorary Doctorate of Humane Letters, University of Michigan
 2014 Peabody Award for Norris's NPR series The Race Card Project

Personal life
Norris lives in the District of Columbia with her husband, Broderick D. Johnson, the former White House Cabinet Secretary for President Barack Obama, and her daughter, son, and stepson.

References

External links
 
 Radio Interview on WUNC's The State of Things: The Grace of Silence
 The Race Card Project
 

1961 births
Living people
African-American journalists
African-American radio personalities
American broadcast news analysts
American memoirists
American radio journalists
American radio reporters and correspondents
Chicago Tribune people
Emmy Award winners
Los Angeles Times people
NPR personalities
Journalists from Minnesota
University of Minnesota School of Journalism and Mass Communication alumni
University of Wisconsin–Madison College of Engineering alumni
The Washington Post people
Writers from Minnesota
Journalists from Washington, D.C.
African-American women journalists
American women memoirists
American women television journalists
American women radio journalists
21st-century African-American people
21st-century African-American women
20th-century African-American people
20th-century African-American women